Luzhu huoshao is one of the most well-known traditional Beijing street foods. Long considered a luxury, the cuisine is especially prevalent in Beijing. The main ingredients are pork, pork lung, pork intestines, pork liver, tofu, and some may add fermented bean curd or chives sauce. It is served with bing bread.

Origin and history 
The origins of luzhu huoshao  can be traced back to the Qing dynasty as a palace food in Peking. According to legends, "su zao rou" was a dish invented by Zhang Dongguan as a tribute for Qianlong Emperor during one of Qianlong' inspection to Suzhou around 1970 and it was the origin of luzhu huoshao . Zhang Dongguan's cooking style involved unique combinations of medicinal herbs and spices in cooking. His technique impressed the emperor, and Zhang eventually became the lead cook in the palace. Over time, the recipe of "su zao rou" spread beyond the walls of palace to the rest of Beijing, and many people tried to imitate the recipe to eat like an emperor.  However the key ingredient of the dish, pork belly, was not very affordable for many people at that time. Pork lung, intestines and many other types of pork offal were used as a substitute for pork belly in order to make the most people able to afford this dish. Hence, luzhu huoshao was formed over generations, and since then, it has become one of the most well-known Beijing street food, and still in fashion nowadays.

Popularity 
Much like Stinky tofu, luzhu huoshao also has a very strong odor, and it could be a challenge for people who haven't ever tried before. However, it is still one of the most famous Beijing traditional street foods, and a "must try" for local Beijing people. Cui Daiyuan (崔岱远), a contemporary writer from Beijing, wrote in his book "The flavor of Beijing" (京味儿) that luzhu huoshao is "a food that allows the poor people to experience the superior life" (穷人解馋的玩意).  In his opinion, Beijing's street foods such as luzhu huoshao provides a chance for the poor people to experience how the foods in palace taste like. Nowadays, eating luzhu huoshao is more like a custom that Beijing people feels attached with. Not everyone would accept the strong odor, but people who likes it certainly feels attached to it and the traditional Beijing culture. Many restaurants that sells luzhu huoshao can still be found in Beijing and even overseas.

Characteristics 
There are certain characteristics that are expected from a well made luzhu huoshao, which also make it a unique Beijing street food. Similar to baodu, the meat in a well made luzhu huoshao is supposed to be reasonably chewy, neither too tough nor falling apart. The dish is known for having an unappetizing appearance, but the taste is considered rather complex and savory due to the complex mixes of herb supplemented with soy sauce. The huo shao (Bing (bread)) is soaked in the soup to flavor it. Pork offal usually has a strong odor, but as luzhu huoshao is freshly made, a proper dish should lack any offensive taste or smell.

See also 
Chinese cuisine
Beijing cuisine

References

Beijing cuisine